Sihem is a feminine given name of Arabic origin.

List of people with the given name 

 Sihem Amer-Yahia, Algerian computer scientist
 Sihem Aouini (born 1982),Tunisian team handball player
 Sihem Badi (born 1967), Tunisian politician
 Sihem Bensedrine (born 1950), Tunisian journalist and human rights activist
 Sihem Boughdiri (born 1965), Tunisian banker and politician
 Sihem Habchi (born 1975), French feminist of Algerian descent
 Sihem Hemissi, (born 1985) is an Algerian team handball player

See also 

 Siemens

Feminine given names
Arabic feminine given names